La Michoacana is a group of different Mexican ice cream parlors, with an estimated 8 to 15 thousand locations in Mexico.  The "chain" is a successful business model network of family-run businesses, no single company operates them as a formal franchise operation. In 1992 Alejandro Andrade and a group of enthusiastic ITESO students developed an image that would unify all La Michoacana parlors. And now it is an image that belongs to the entire town of Tocumbo.  Paleterias bearing the name La Michoacana (or variations of this) are also found throughout the United States, Central and South America.

Controversy 
The informal structure of the business has led to legal battles over the rights to the "La Michoacana" brand. Currently, there are 3 different brands in Mexico that claim the ownership of the name. These are Paleterías La Michoacana, La Nueva Michoacana, and Helados La Michoacana. All of them present the emblematic aesthetic of the name, presenting pink and black color palettes, and heavily featuring a Mexican woman in the logo.

Also, due to the fact these are not operated as franchises but rather as small, independent businesses that choose to use the name, the quality of the product, pricing, and variety, the product itself can vary widely between locations.

References 

Ice cream brands
Ice cream parlors
Dairy products companies of Mexico